The 2010 United States Senate election in Pennsylvania took place on November 2, 2010, during the 2010 midterm elections. Incumbent Republican-turned-Democrat U.S. Senator Arlen Specter ran for reelection to a sixth term, but lost in the Democratic primary to Joe Sestak. Republican nominee Pat Toomey then won the seat.

Toomey had previously run for United States Senate in 2004, challenging Specter for the Republican nomination, but was narrowly defeated in the primary. Specter went on to be reelected to his fifth term, defeating the Democratic nominee, Congressman Joe Hoeffel. Toomey announced on April 15, 2009, that he would again seek the Republican nomination for U.S. Senate in the 2010 election.

The primary season was marked by Specter's decision in early 2009 to switch from the Republican Party to the Democratic Party due to his disagreement with the increasingly conservative positions of the party, pitting him against Sestak in the Democratic primary. The contest, characterized by attacks between the two Democratic candidates, was one of the most-watched primary races of the 2010 election cycle. Sestak ultimately defeated Specter in the May 18 primary, garnering 53.9% of the vote, to Specter's 46.1%. Pat Toomey easily defeated challenger Peg Luksik for the Republican nomination. Toomey received 81.5% of the vote, to Luksik's 18.5%.

Toomey defeated Sestak in the general election on November 2, 2010. Toomey garnered 2,028,945 votes (51.01%) to Sestak's 1,948,716 (48.99%), a margin of 80,229 votes (2.02%). The race was called by the Associated Press shortly before midnight. Not long thereafter, Sestak officially conceded the election to Toomey. Toomey's winning margin made this election the third-closest race of the 2010 Senate election cycle, behind only the elections in Illinois and Colorado. As of 2022, this is the last time that Lehigh County and Monroe County voted for a Republican.

Democratic primary

Candidates 
 Joe Sestak, U.S. Congressman
 Arlen Specter, Incumbent U.S. Senator
William C. Kortz, Member of Pennsylvania House of Representatives (withdrawn candidacy)

Campaign 

The Democratic party race between Specter and Sestak was considered one of the most bitter and highly watched of all the 2010 primary elections. On April 28, 2009, Specter switched to the Democratic Party after having served in the Senate as a Republican for 28 years, encouraged by Vice President Joe Biden and Pennsylvania Governor Ed Rendell, after he had voted in favor of President Barack Obama's economic stimulus plan and was faced with opposition from Pennsylvania Republicans. Although Specter claimed he switched largely because he disagreed with the increasingly conservative direction the Republican Party was heading in, he also admitted that the switch was due to his poor chances of winning a Republican primary against Toomey due to Specter's support of the Obama stimulus package . The Democratic establishment had till then encouraged Sestak, a former U.S. Navy admiral and the representative of Pennsylvania's 7th congressional district, to run in the Democratic primary. But after Specter switched parties he was largely embraced by such major Democratic figures as Obama, Biden, Rendell and Senate Majority Leader Harry Reid. The Democratic establishment now feared Sestak would harm Specter's chances in the general election and encouraged him to drop out, but Sestak refused and strongly criticized Specter's party switch as an opportunistic move aimed solely at political self-preservation.

Specter led Sestak by more than 20 percentage points in polling for most of the race and, while Sestak struggled to overcome problems from his low name recognition, Specter received endorsements from major Democratic figures and influential organizations like the AFL-CIO and Pennsylvania Democratic Committee. Specter's lead narrowed significantly in the final month of the campaign, when Sestak concentrated his funds and efforts on television commercials that questioned Specter's Democratic credentials. As the race progressed, Specter grew more strongly critical of Sestak, attacking his House attendance record, accusing him of failing to pay his staffers' minimum wage, and claiming that he was demoted in the Navy for creating a "poor command climate". On May 18, Sestak ended Specter's nearly 30-year Senate career, earning 53.8 percent of the primary vote to Specter's 46.2 percent. Political observers said the commercials played a major part in Sestak's victory, and that a national swing in momentum toward Republicans and against incumbents ultimately harmed Specter's chances. During the primary campaign, it was revealed that former President Bill Clinton had offered Sestak a position in the Obama administration if he withdrew his candidacy. This drew allegations from Republicans that the administration violated federal statutes forbidding government employees from interfering with a Senate election, but no formal investigation was opened. The Democratic primary occurred on May 18, 2010. Although Specter had won the endorsement of the Pennsylvania Democratic Party, at 10:14 PM EDT that evening, the Associated Press projected the race as won by Sestak.

Polling

Results

Republican primary

Background 
Pat Toomey, a Republican former Congressman representing the Lehigh Valley-based 15th congressional district, had previously challenged incumbent Arlen Specter in the Republican primary of the 2004 Senate race, in which the conservative Toomey tried to portray Specter as too liberal. Although Toomey ultimately lost, he came within 17,000 votes (less than two percentage points) of beating Specter, despite the long-time Senator's strong name recognition and wide support from party leaders. In an interview with The Hill on 1 December 2008, Toomey said he was considering a 2010 bid against Specter, whom he said was "significantly more vulnerable now than he was in 2004". Toomey claimed that many liberal and moderate Republicans had since abandoned the party to join the Democratic Party during the 2008 presidential primaries, eliminating many of Specter's core constituents from a closed Republican primary.

The next month, however, Toomey announced he would not likely not run for Senate again and said he was instead seriously considering a possible bid for governor in 2010. But after Specter voted in favor of the Barack Obama-supported stimulus proposal aimed at stopping the economic recession, Toomey began to once again contemplate running for Senate, claiming he believed the incumbent Senator was supporting federal government bailouts and spending plans that were "taking the country on a dangerously wrong path". In discussions with potential supporters in his possible governor bid, dozens of Pennsylvanians urged Toomey to challenge Specter, who was considered particularly vulnerable because he had supported the Democrats' stimulus plan. In early March, Toomey began to privately assure supporters he would run against Specter, and during a March 28 keynote address before the Pennsylvania Leadership Conference in Harrisburg, he announced, "It's very likely that very soon I will be a candidate for the U.S. Senate"; the 600 audience members gave him a standing ovation at the news.

Peg Luksik, a conservative anti-abortion activist from Johnstown who previously lost bids for governor in 1990 and 1994, had announced her candidacy for the Republican primary in March. Although some questioned her lack of elected office experience and limited knowledge of foreign affairs, Luksik said she planned to be an advocate against big government and excessive spending. During a conversation in February 2009, Toomey had assured her he did not plan to run for Senate again. She was present the next month at the Pennsylvania Leadership Conference when Toomey announced his plans to run, but Luksik said she nevertheless planned to stay in the race. She said she did not feel betrayed by Toomey's surprise announcement, adding, "I understand these two men have a long, personal and rather vindictive history and there's a real desire for the two of them to go and hit each other with sticks. I get that. I have five sons." Her candidacy led to speculation that Luksik and Toomey could split the conservative vote, which could help Specter secure a victory in the primary from moderate voters, but Luksik said she would resist any efforts by conservative Republicans to pressure her into withdrawing.

Candidates 
 Arlen Specter, incumbent U.S. Senator (switched to Democratic Party) 
 Pat Toomey, former U.S. Representative
 Peg Luksik, conservative activist

Campaign

Specter's party switch 

Pat Toomey formally announced his candidacy on April 15, 2009, Tax Day, via a video on his website, and stepped down as head of the anti-tax political organization Club for Growth to concentrate on his campaign. A Quinnipiac University Polling Institute poll released the previous month had indicated Toomey would defeat Specter by 14 percentage points in a two-man race if the primary were held that day. That same poll, however, found three out of four Republicans didn't yet know enough about Toomey to form an opinion about him. Some Republicans expressed concerns that if Toomey defeated Specter in the closed Republican primary, he would be a weaker candidate in the general election and the party could risk losing the Senate seat to the Democrats. Toomey rejected such concerns, pointed to his two successful reelections in the Democratic-leaning Lehigh Valley congressional district as proof he could win votes from the opposing party. Rumors began to circulate that Senator John Cornyn, chairman of the National Republican Senatorial Committee and a Specter supporter, had asked Toomey to drop his candidacy, but Toomey denied those claims. Nevertheless, Toomey received some early support from conservatives like Jim DeMint, the senator from South Carolina who endorsed Toomey and donated thousands of dollars to his campaign.

Starting in April, Specter made the rare move of starting to run television advertisements more than a year before the primary election, linking Toomey's background as a Wall Street banker and support of credit default swaps to the economic crisis. While Toomey criticized Specter as a liberal who consistently sided with the Democratic majority, Specter stressed that if Toomey won the primary, he would lose the general election and give Democrats a 60th seat in the Senate, which would allow them to suppress Republican filibusters. In an interview on Morning Joe, Specter said, "If Mr. Toomey is the nominee, you can be sure he'll lose. He's to the right of Rick Santorum. Santorum lost by 18 points, spent $31 million and was a two-term incumbent." Stuart Rothenberg, editor of the Rothenberg Political Report, said of the expected primary match-up, "Republicans will have to decide whether they want to hold the seat or make a statement about issues and ideology."

On April 28, 2009, however, Specter announced he was leaving the Republican Party and becoming a Democrat, claiming he disagreed with the increasingly conservative direction the party was heading in and found his personal philosophy was now better aligned with the Democratic Party. Although Specter said his decision was made primarily based on principle, he admitted it was also partially due to his poor chances of beating Toomey in the Republican primary: "I have traveled the state and surveyed the sentiments of the Republican Party in Pennsylvania and public opinion polls, observed other public opinion polls and have found that the prospects for winning a Republican primary are bleak." Toomey became widely considered the favorite to win the Republican primary as a result of Specter's defection. Peg Luksik said of Specter's switch, "It is clear that Arlen Specter stands with President Obama on a host of issues and with this decision, has gone home to the Democratic Party."

Republican primary 

With Specter's departure from the primary, some speculated that a less conservative candidate than Toomey was needed to defeat Specter in the general election, since the state had previously supported Barack Obama in the 2008 presidential election. John Cornyn declined to immediately endorse Toomey and Senator Orrin Hatch, vice chairman of the National Republican Senatorial Committee, said of him, "I don't think there is anybody in the world who believes he can get elected senator there." Names of other potential Republican candidates began to be floated, like Congressman Jim Gerlach, Lieutenant Governor Joseph B. Scarnati, and State Senate Majority Leader Dominic F. Pileggi, none of whom ruled out running. Some, like Senator Lindsey Graham and Republican State Committee Chairman Robert Gleason, suggested former governor Tom Ridge might be a suitable candidate. Ridge began to seriously contemplate a run, and Quinnipiac University polls indicated Specter held a projected lead over Ridge of only three percentage points, compared to 20 points over Toomey.

Even before Ridge made a final decision, however, conservative bloggers began criticizing Ridge's moderate positions and support for abortion rights. Political opponents also circulated e-mail messages questioning Ridge's residency eligibility because, although he still voted in Pennsylvania, he lived in Chevy Chase, Maryland. On May 7, Ridge announced he would not run in the primary, claiming he preferred to continue supporting the Republican Party by promoting causes as a private citizen. Some felt Ridge's decision not to run ended the Republican Party's best chance to win the seat from Specter. But Toomey expressed confidence he could beat the incumbent senator, claiming Democrats would find him difficult to trust after seeing the way he abandoned the Republicans. Toomey said he "expected to beat Arlen Specter soundly in the Republican primary, but I had no idea I would drive him clear out of the party." A Quinnipiac University poll released on May 28 projected Toomey now trailed Specter by nine percentage points, a smaller gap than Specter's 20-point lead from a May 4 survey.

Although Toomey anticipated that other candidates would enter the race, the Republican primary remained a two-way race between him and Luksik. State Senator Jane Orie, from the North Hills area of Pennsylvania, briefly considered entering the race but announced on July 13 that she would not run because she wanted to concentrate on the state budget. The National Republican Senatorial Committee announced on July 14 that it was endorsing Toomey, even though the group previously helped Specter defeat Toomey in 2004. It was considered a key endorsement expected to help improve fund-raising efforts for Toomey, who had already raised $1.6 million in the previous three-month quarter. By July 22, polls indicated that Specter's projected lead over Toomey had nearly disappeared, as the Senator now led him only 45-44 percent. That same poll showed Toomey led Luksik by 47 percent to 6 percent, a margin so large that media outlets predicted Luksik stood little chance of overcoming him; the Pittsburgh Post-Gazette said Luksik was "not considered to be a stiff challenge". By August, Toomey had an even greater advantage in the polls, 12 points, over Specter.

Following an e-mail exchange with the Democratic challenger Joe Sestak about health care, Toomey agreed to an unorthodox proposal by Sestak to hold a joint town hall about the issue, which was held September 2 at Muhlenberg College in Allentown. Specter was not invited to participate, and political pollster G. Terry Madonna described it as an "informal pact" between Sestak and Toomey to weaken their joint rival, something the two men denied. Commentators suggested Toomey was willing to help Sestak at this stage of the race because he preferred Sestak as a general election opponent rather than Specter, who could possibly steal Republican and Independent voters from Toomey. By October, Toomey had raised a total of $3.1 million for the race, but spent $861,000 in the past three-month quarter as he traveled across the state for his campaign. In contrast, Luksik raised less than $100,000 from June to October. Also in October, Toomey was endorsed by former Massachusetts Governor and presidential candidate Mitt Romney, who called Toomey the "man for the job" and pledged to help him raise funds.

Late campaign 

Toomey continued to hold projected leads against his Democratic opponents as the primary campaign entered 2010, with January polls indicating he held a 14-point lead over Specter and a 17-point lead over Sestak. Some political scientists, like G. Terry Madonna and Jeff Brauer, attributed Toomey's gains to voter dissatisfaction with the health-care plan before Congress and a poor national political climate for Democrats and incumbents. Toomey's campaign continued to portray him as a political outsider and small-government advocate while condemning Specter and Sestak as "a rubber stamp for the Reid-Pelosi big government agenda". In February, it was announced Toomey raised more money than Specter in the final three months of 2009, earning $1.67 million compared to Specter's $1.15 million, although Specter's total war chest of $8.66 million was still significantly larger than Toomey's $2.8 million. In that same quarter, Peg Luksik raised $163,000 and had $66,000 on hand. On February 13, the Republican State Committee of Pennsylvania endorsed Toomey over Peg Luskik in the Senate race. Toomey told the committee he would work to restore fiscally conservative principals to Washington and fight to eliminate street money, or state grants offered in exchange for support on key issues. When asked whether Luksik would continue to run, she replied, "Absolutely. Are you kidding? I always run un-endorsed."

With news outlets like the Pittsburgh Post-Gazette and Fox News predicting Toomey would have little difficult defeating Luksik in the primary, Toomey again became involved with the Democratic primary by accepting an invitation to a second debate with Sestak, who had been trying unsuccessfully to engage Arlen Specter in more than one primary debate. In accepting the April 11 debate, Toomey said, "Like many politicians who have spent decades in Washington, Sen. Specter maintains a sense of entitlement to his office and he is unwilling to put his record and ideas to the test of open and honest debate." In response to the scheduled debate, Luksik spokesman Steve Clark said Toomey had to remember he was running against Luksik in the primary, not Sestak or Specter. By March, Specter appeared to be gaining momentum in the Democratic primary, with polls indicating he not only led Sestak by 24 percentage points, but had recaptured a projected lead against Toomey in the general election by a margin of 49 percent to 42 percent. Pollsters indicated Specter was benefiting greatly from the large amount of media attention the Democratic primary had received, as well as the Senator's strong name recognition, whereas Sestak and Toomey remained relatively unknown.

When the Senate candidates publicly released their quarterly campaign finance reports on April 15, it was revealed that Pat Toomey once again raised more in the first three months of 2010 than either Democratic candidate, increasing his funds by $2.3 million to a total of a $4.1 million war chest compared to Specter raising $1.1 million to a total of $9.1 million and Sestak raising $0.4 million to a total of $5.3 million. The funds raised that quarter made Toomey the best-funded Senate challenger in the country to that point. Political analysts attributed Toomey's success to the national swing in momentum toward Republicans, and said it could indicate the Republicans would be victorious in many Senate races, including in Pennsylvania. Meanwhile, Luksik continued to campaign in low-attendance appearances on conservative anti-abortion, anti-tax and anti-spending principles, while portraying herself as a down-to-earth housewife and common-sense candidate. In the days leading up to the primary election, Toomey received endorsements by the Pittsburgh Post-Gazette and the Pittsburgh Tribune-Review. On May 10, he ran his first television advertisement, which called for more jobs and less government and included a narrator saying, "Trillion dollar bailouts and deficits, government-run health care, record unemployment. Had enough?" John Baer of the Philadelphia Daily News said Toomey was so widely expected to defeat Luksik that he said of the Republican primary, "The race is a balloon with no air. It sits flat while the Democratic fight between Arlen Specter and Joe Sestak sucks up all the oxygen." 

Pat Toomey won the May 18 primary with 81.5 percent of the vote, or 668,409 of the votes cast, compared to 18.5 percent and 151,802 votes for Peg Luksik. The Associated Press wrote that Luksik could not overcome Toomey's financial advantages, particularly when the Republican primary was so overshadowed by the Democratic race. The Philadelphia Inquirer wrote that Toomey's run against Luksik in the primary "will help him maintain his competitive condition" against Sestak, who defeated Specter in the Democratic primary.

Polling 

* Declined to run for Republican nomination

Results

General election

Candidates 
 Pat Toomey (R), former U.S. Congressman
 Joe Sestak (D), U.S. Congressman

Campaign

Early weeks 

Shortly after Joe Sestak's primary victory, Arlen Specter called him to offer congratulations and vowed to support his candidacy, saying that "I think it's vital to keep this seat in the Democratic Party." Both Sestak and Pat Toomey began campaigning for the general election the day after the May 18 primary. Before reporting to Capitol Hill for House matters, Sestak appeared in interviews on several national media outlets including CNN, MSNBC, NPR and CBS News. Both Toomey and Sestak said they considered each other friends and vowed to engage in a "clean" campaign focusing on policy rather than personal attacks. The two quickly began challenging each other's records, however, with Sestak citing Toomey's past Wall Street career and claiming he would rather aid rich bankers than the working class, and Toomey portraying Sestak as a liberal aligned with Harry Reid and Nancy Pelosi. The day after the primary, Sestak claimed that Toomey wanted to continue "to back failed policies of George W. Bush" and "to let Wall Street do whatever it wants". At a rally at the Allegheny County Airport, Toomey said Sestak's politics were more liberal than most mainstream Democrats and described him as a proponent of "even-larger government".

Within minutes of Sestak's victory, National Republican Senatorial Committee Chairman John Cornyn issued a statement describing Sestak as too liberal for Pennsylvania, claiming that he consistently voted with Washington Democratic leaders and supported energy policies that would reduce jobs. President Barack Obama, Vice President Joe Biden, and Pennsylvania Governor Ed Rendell, all of whom vocally supported Specter in the primary, each called Sestak after his primary victory and pledged to support him in the general election. Congressman Darrell Issa, the ranking Republican on the House Committee on Oversight and Government Reform, said it would "be incredibly disingenuous and reek of political payback" for Sestak to accept any such support from the Obama administration after Sestak had accused the White House of offering him a job in exchange for dropping out of the Democratic primary. Nevertheless, while Sestak said he would not become "part of the establishment", he welcomed the Obama administration's support and said, "I plan on being the president's best ally."

On May 20, Toomey released the first statewide advertisement of the campaign, a television commercial with a narrator describing both candidates as "Two good men with very different ideas." The ad contrasted the positions between the two candidates on the Wall Street bailout, national health-care debate and terrorist trials. Meanwhile, Sestak said Toomey needed to be held accountable for his support of bank deregulation and former President George W. Bush's financial policies which helped lead to the economic recession. The Democratic Senatorial Campaign Committee said Toomey was "conveniently failing to mention his decades of service to Wall Street" in his advertisements. When asked about the promise between Sestak and Toomey to maintain a clean and friendly campaign, Pennsylvania Democratic Party Chairman T.J. Rooney said, "Guess what? That all changed at 10:30 p.m. (Tuesday). I hope the congressman adheres to his word, but I have no consuming expectation that he will. It's going to get hard in a moment. This race is going to take a turn."

Early polls showed varied results over who was leading, although some indicated Sestak had an advantage due to the positive press he received for defeating Arlen Specter. Despite Specter's stated support for Sestak, the Senator's former chief of staff David Urban, now a lobbyist, offered his support to Toomey after the Democratic primary ended. Urban sought to connect moderate Republicans, conservative Democrats and the current and former chiefs of staff of Republicans and encourage them to help Toomey get elected. Both candidates sought to use online media avenues to reach out to prospective voters, which was still considered a relatively new field for politicians. The two started accounts on Twitter, with the ToomeyForSenate account amassing 4,907 followers and the Sestak2010 account 3,796 followers as of June 4. Both also had accounts on Facebook, where Toomey had 10,361 friends and Sestak had 3,146.
Sestak and Toomey had wildly different views on almost every issue, including abortion, health care, energy, social security and the recent stimulus bill and financial bailouts. Sestak favored the bailouts of the United States financial system, automobile industry and mortgage giants Fannie Mae and Freddie Mac, claiming they saved many jobs and homes. Toomey condemned them as a waste of taxpayer money that rewarded irresponsible behavior. Sestak praised the financial regulatory reform bill before Congress as "a victory for the American people over Wall Street" that would protect the economy from shadow banking and toxic assets. Toomey said it did nothing to prevent taxpayer bailouts of failing corporations. Toomey also argued against a proposed cap and trade bill, which he said would encourage firms to move manufacturing jobs overseas and force Pennsylvania businesses to close. Sestak claimed the bill would help businesses by lowering energy costs in the long-run, claiming, "Pat Toomey is in the pocket of big oil, and big oil doesn't want alternative energy."

Following the Deepwater Horizon oil spill in the Gulf of Mexico, Sestak criticized Toomey for his support of offshore drilling in Lake Erie, claiming the proposal risked placing 90 percent of the country's surface water in danger. Toomey said that he supported allowing states to retain the right to make decisions about drilling, and claimed Sestak was too willing to cede control to the federal government. Both Sestak and Toomey sought to portray themselves as the ideal candidates for small-business issues. Toomey campaigned on lower taxes and less regulation, and released a 30-second television advertisement emphasizing his experience as owner of a small chain of bars and restaurants in the 1990s. Sestak countered that image, however, citing past court depositions that indicated Toomey was not very involved in the businesses and delegated most responsibilities to his brother Steven. Sestak said he would help small businesses through tax cuts and federal loan guarantees.

Heading into July, polls still indicated that the two candidates were roughly even. Peter Brown, assistant director of the Quinnipiac University Polling Institute, said this was better news for Toomey than Sestak because it meant Toomey had "limited the damage" from the national positive publicity Sestak received after defeating Arlen Specter. From April 1 to June 30, Toomey raised $3.1 million compared to Sestak's $1.95 million. This left Toomey with $4.56 million in total funds, more than twice Sestak's total amount of about $2 million. Toomey was considered to have a financial advantage in part because he did not have as challenging a primary as Sestak, and thus was able to save most of his money. Additionally, the Democratic Senatorial Campaign Committee spent $1.4 million of the allotted sum in support of Specter during the primary, which left them with only $200,000 for the general election race.

In July, Toomey began airing five new television commercials, focusing on how he would oppose the Democratic establishment if elected, and four focusing on different votes Sestak had cast in the House: the stimulus plan, health-care reform, cap and trade, and tax increases. The ads characterized Sestak's positions as extreme, and each ended with a narrator saying, "That's liberal. That's Joe Sestak." Although they directly attacked Sestak, Toomey claimed that they did not break the candidates' pledge for a clean campaign because they focused on his policies, not his character. By running the commercials four months before the general election campaign, Toomey hoped to gain an advantage in name recognition. Also in July, the United States Chamber of Commerce began running television advertisements criticizing Sestak's support of "a government takeover of health care" and "billions in job-killing energy taxes", claiming he voted with Nancy Pelosi "100 percent of the time". Sestak called the ads inaccurate, citing specific instances when he voted against Pelosi; Two Pennsylvania television stations removed the ads, but Toomey defended them, claiming they were not misleading and accusing Sestak of being "hyper-sensitive".

Final campaign 
Starting in July, both Sestak and Toomey blamed each other for the federal budget deficits that had become a national spotlight amid the troubled economy. Toomey portrayed Sestak as lacking "fiscal discipline" and supporting budget earmarks for pet projects, while Sestak said Toomey supported President George W. Bush's deficit spending and damaged the economy by helping deregulate Wall Street. On July 15, The Philadelphia Inquirer reported that Sestak received at least $119,650 in campaign contributions from employees of companies that received federal earmarks he had steered to the state since 2008. Although a common practice among political candidates, Sestak had advocated banning earmarks in favor of a competitive grant program, and vowed on his website to return any contributions from organizations or individuals who "has made a request for an appropriations project". In response to the story, Toomey called on Sestak to return those contributions, which he did not respond to. However, Sestak said he routinely returned money from employees of such companies, but sometimes had difficulty tracking donations from low-level employees. Toomey vowed never to seek earmarks if elected, while Sestak said although he favors ending the practice, he would continue advocating for them as long as earmarks continued to exist.

While Sestak presented economists who agreed with his positions, the conservative non-profit Citizens Against Government Waste gave him a zero rating on spending issues based on a review of 120 of his votes in Congress. Toomey challenged Sestak to sign a "No Pork" pledge offered by the organization. In turn, Sestak criticized Toomey for accepting campaign contributions from Club for Growth, a group that Toomey used to spearhead and which received criticism from such prominent Republicans as Senator Orrin Hatch, Senator John McCain and former Arkansas Governor Mike Huckabee.

On August 2, moderate Republican Senator Susan Collins, who was once condemned by Toomey's Club for Growth for her support of the stimulus package, headlined a $1,000-a-plate luncheon for Toomey's campaign at Philadelphia's Union League. The Philadelphia Inquirer said Collins' support indicated Toomey was finding success in seeking moderate support for his candidacy. The newspaper noted other apparent efforts to draw in centrists, including Toomey's support for Supreme Court Justice Sonia Sotomayor, who many conservatives opposed, and the fact that throughout the campaign Toomey had rarely brought up social issues like gay rights and abortion, for which he held conservative views. Sestak's campaign claimed those gestures only sought to conceal an extremely conservative voting record.

The first debate was held on October 20 at WPVI-TV studios in Philadelphia and the second held on October 22 at WPXI studios in Pittsburgh. Both candidates criticized the each other's ideology and referred to the other as extreme. Toomey heavily criticized Sestak for his support of Obama's stimulus, cap and trade, and healthcare reform. Sestak not only supported these measures but said they did not go far enough, referred to Toomey as "Pennsylvania's most right-wing congressman", and criticized him for working at Wall Street and supporting the elimination of corporate taxes.

Toomey was endorsed by former longtime Democratic Mayor of Harrisburg Stephen Reed, former NYC Mayor Rudy Giuliani, United States Chamber of Commerce, NRA, U.S. Senator Scott Brown and former governor Sarah Palin. Newspaper endorsements include the Pittsburgh Tribune-Review, The Intelligencer, The Tribune-Democrat and the Bucks County Courier Times. 

Sestak was endorsed by independent NYC Mayor Michael Bloomberg and former Republican U.S. Senator Chuck Hagel. Sestak received newspaper endorsements from the Pittsburgh Post-Gazette, The Philadelphia Inquirer, the Erie Times-News, The Citizens' Voice, The Patriot-News, the Observer-Reporter, and The Huffington Post.

Toomey defeated Sestak on election day by a margin of 80,229 votes, and 2.1 percentage points. The Associated Press called the race for Toomey shortly after midnight. The Washington Post credited his victory to voter discontent with the Obama administration and unemployment rates. Sestak conceded defeat addressing a crowd at a suburban Philadelphia hotel in his congressional district, stating "it is now Alex time" referring to his 9-year-old daughter. Toomey gave his victory speech at a get together in Allentown, stating that the election was a "simple, clear message to the establishment" with some conciliatory notes that he would cooperate with the White House and fellow Pennsylvania Senator, Bob Casey Jr, a Democrat. It was third-closest race of the 2010 Senate elections, behind only Illinois and Colorado.

Predictions

Polling

Fundraising

Results

References

External links 
 Pennsylvania Department of State
 Official election results
 Official general information for voting, no candidate lists
 Imagine Election – Look up which district you live in, and who is running for US Representative there, using your address or zip code.
 U.S. Congress candidates for Pennsylvania at Project Vote Smart
 Pennsylvania U.S. Senate 2010 from OurCampaigns.com
 Campaign contributions from Open Secrets
 2010 Pennsylvania Senate General Election: All Head-to-Head Matchups graph of multiple polls from Pollster.com
 Election 2010: Pennsylvania Senate from Rasmussen Reports
 2010 Pennsylvania Senate Race from Real Clear Politics
 2010 Pennsylvania Senate Race from CQ Politics
 Race profile from The New York Times
Debates
 Pennsylvania Senate Debate, C-SPAN, May 1, 2010
Official campaign sites
 Joe Sestak for U.S. Senate (archived from October 28, 2010)
 Pat Toomey for U.S Senate

Senate
2010
Pennsylvania